The Grain of Dust is a lost 1928 silent film drama directed by George Archainbaud and starring Ricardo Cortez and Claire Windsor. It was produced by John M. Stahl and released through Tiffany Pictures.

Cast
Ricardo Cortez as Fred Norman 
Claire Windsor as Josephine Burroughs
Alma Bennett as Dorothea Hallowell
Richard Tucker as George
John St. Polis as Mr. Burroughs
Otto Hoffman as Head Clerk

References

External links

The Grain of Dust at IMDb.com

1928 films
American silent feature films
Lost American films
Tiffany Pictures films
American black-and-white films
Silent American drama films
1928 drama films
1928 lost films
Lost drama films
Films directed by George Archainbaud
1920s American films